The Tallmantz Phoenix P-1 was an FAA-certified one-off aircraft built for the 1965 film production The Flight of the Phoenix and used in the picture's initial aerial sequences. Its pilot Paul Mantz was killed in an accident during a touch-and-go maneuver to simulate a takeoff, after which the plane was replaced by a crudely modified North American O-47A.

Design and development
In late 1964 or early 1965 Tallmantz Aviation, Inc. of Orange County, California was hired by 20th Century Fox to supervise the aerial sequences for their upcoming film The Flight of the Phoenix. Tallmantz Aviation owners Mantz and Frank Tallman were well-known movie stunt pilots, but in order to provide a realistic film prop, they hired Otto Timm, a highly respected aeronautical engineer and designer, to create a new aircraft.

Timm, following the storyline of the film, designed a hybrid plane using parts taken from other aircraft to resemble the reconstructed Fairchild C-82 Packet shown prominently in the film as having crashed in the desert.

The Tallmantz Phoenix P-1 was constructed from the following components:
 North American T-6 Texan engine, cowling, propeller, undercarriage wheels and cockpit controls
 Beechcraft C-45 Expeditor wings
 North American L-17 Navion wheel used as the P-1's tailwheel
 Tallmantz-designed and constructed fuselage, wing roots and skids

At its workshops near Santa Ana, California, Tallmantz built an open cockpit fuselage consisting of a tubular steel framework surrounded by circular wooden bracing frames with a plywood covering, and the tail section was similar in construction. The skids were scratch-built from steel parts while wire bracing was added, made from clothesline to intentionally create a flimsy look. Although wheels were used, they were camouflaged in the final print of the film in order to make it appear that the aircraft was fitted with skids only.

Construction was completed in June 1965 and the completed model was submitted to the Federal Aviation Administration (FAA), which issued an airworthiness certificate on June 14.
 
A second Phoenix model, built to closely resemble the main P-1 but not for actual flight, was constructed from Fairchild R4Q-1 (a USMC version of the C-82) components and was used extensively for ground shots, including some in which its engine was running.

Film work
Principal photography for The Flight of the Phoenix began on April 26, 1965 at the 20th Century Fox Studios and 20th Century Fox Ranch, California. Other filming locations were Buttercup Valley and Pilot Knob Mesa, California. The flying sequences were all filmed at Pilot Knob Mesa, Winterhaven, located in Imperial Valley, California on the northern fringes of Yuma, Arizona.

In addition to the Phoenix P-1 prop, a number of other models were used in the film, including:
Fairchild C-82A Packet, N6887C, flying shots
Fairchild C-82A Packet, N4833V, outdoor location wreck
Fairchild C-82A Packet, N53228, indoor studio wreck
Fairchild R4Q-1 Packet, BuNo. 126589, non-flying Phoenix prop

Although Frank Tallman had flown the Phoenix P-1 for the first aerial shots on July 7, 1965, he injured his leg in a freak go-kart accident with his young son and was hospitalized. Second-unit director Oscar Rudolph called for another takeoff to ensure that a usable take would be filmed. Paul Mantz, who had completed the majority of the trial flights in the P-1, volunteered to stand in for his partner.

During filming on July 8, 1965, Mantz tried to simulate a takeoff by executing a touch-and-go maneuver. As Mantz descended for another low camera pass, his rate of descent at 90 mph exceeded the plane's structural capacity. The modest impact of the touchdown, coupled with the sudden drag caused by the aircraft's cobbled skid/wheel landing gear, caused the boom section behind the wings to fail, propelling the nose section forward, and the P-1 broke apart violently, killing Paul Mantz instantly. Stuntman Bobby Rose, also on board, was thrown clear and survived with a broken shoulder and pelvis. The tail boom cracked just aft of the wing as the right skid hit the ground while the left skid and tail wheel were still in the air.

In the subsequent accident investigation, a number of factors were identified, including Mantz's misjudgment of the pullout speed of the Phoenix P-1. He contended with a nose-heavy configuration, with no flaps or adequate trim to slow the aircraft in its final descent. Investigators also investigated whether Mantz was impaired by alcohol consumption.

Mantz's body was flown back to Orange County in his B-25 camera plane N1203. The last credit of The Flight of the Phoenix pays tribute to him. 

Although principal photography finished on August 13, 1965, to complete filming, a North American O-47A ms/n 25-554 from the Air Museum in Claremont, California was modified to substitute for the Phoenix. Its canopy was removed, a set of skids was attached under the fuselage and a ventral fin was added to its tail. Filming using the O-47A was completed in October and November 1965. It appears in the film's final flying scenes, painted to resemble the Phoenix P-1.

The final film consisted of a mixture of footage that included the Phoenix P-1, the P-1 replica and the O-47A.

Specifications (Phoenix P-1)

References

Notes

Citations

Bibliography

 Dwiggins, Don. Hollywood Pilot: The Biography of Paul Mantz. Garden City, New York: Doubleday & Company, Inc., 1967. 
 Dwiggins, Don. "Paul Mantz: Kingpin of the Hollywood Air Force." Air Classics Vol. 11, no. 10, October, 1975.
 Elleston, Trevor. Flight of the Phoenix. New York: HarperCollins Publishers, 2004 (reprint of 1964 edition). .
 Hardwick, Jack and Schnepf, Ed. "A Viewer's Guide to Aviation Movies." The Making of the Great Aviation Films, General Aviation Series, Volume 2, 1989.
 Moore, Kevin. "The Tallmantz Story and the Carpetbaggers." Air Classics Summer Issue, no. 2, 1964. 
 Oriss, Bruce. When Hollywood Ruled the Skies: The Aviation Film Classics of World War II. Hawthorne, California: Aero Associates Inc., 1984. .
 Schiller, Gerald A. "Hollywood's Daredevil Pilot." Aviation History Vol. 13, no. 6, July 2003.
 Taylor, John, W.R., ed. Jane's All the World's Aircraft 1965-1966. London: Jane's All the World's Aircraft, 1967. .

External links
 Phoenix P-1
 Check-Six.com - The Final Flight of the Phoenix
 Phoenix films
 A very detailed explanation of the sequence of events surrounding the crash

1960s United States special-purpose aircraft
Phoenix P-1
Prop design